Joyce Reopel (1933–2019) was an American painter, draughtswoman and sculptor who worked in pencil, aquatint, silver- and goldpoint, and an array of old master media. A Boris Mirski Gallery veteran, from 1959–1966, she was known for her refined skills and virtuosity. She was also one of very few women in the early group of Boston artists that included fellow artist and husband Mel Zabarsky, Hyman Bloom, Barbara Swan, Jack Levine, Marianna Pineda, Harold Tovish and others who helped overcome Boston's conservative distaste for the avant-garde, occasionally female, and often Jewish artists later classified as Boston expressionists. Unique to New England, Boston Expressionism has had lasting national and local influence, and is now in its third generation.

Work 
Known for her finely wrought detail and lush sensuality, New York Magazine called Reopel "an artisan as well as an artist," while praising her renderings of the figure because "[t]he artist seems consistently to search out that which lies behind the physical trait. And having discovered it, she presents it in whispers, with unusual understatement and  economy." The results range from expressive realism to subtle surrealism and outright grotesquerie.

A student of sculptor Leonard Baskin at the Worcester Art Museum School, then known as the “Mini-Met,” Reopel shared his fascination with the human form, and his interest in fine arts printing, woodcut, sculpture, etching and typography. Her earliest work can be seen in a 1953 version of T.S. Eliot's The Hollow Men, which she illustrated and helped typeset as an art student. In 1958, she created pen-and-ink cover illustrations for Boston's Audience: A Quarterly Review of Literature and the Arts in an issue featuring several of Anne Sexton's poems and interior illustration by Arthur Polonsky. She also designed many of the catalogues for her 1960s and 1970s aquatint, silver- and goldpoint exhibitions at Boston's Boris Mirski Gallery and, in New York, the Corber Gallery and founder Bella Fishco's Forum Gallery.

As Reopel's work matured, its subtly emotive, even melancholy, rendering of its subjects, were often lyrical in the vein of fellow Boston Expressionist Arthur Polonsky. Her distinctive palette evolved from glints of silver, gold and lead-gray in the early years to subtle tones of grayed blue and green when she turned to oil painting. Her old-master technical skill, meanwhile, reflected an interest in history that was also sometimes reflected in her depictions of historical themes or classical icons.

Education, Awards & Honors 
A graduate of the Worcester Art Museum School, Reopel also spent two years studying at the Ruskin School of Drawing and Fine Arts at Oxford University. Earning recognition and laudits for her work, Reopel was the recipient of numerous awards and fellowships, including a Radcliffe Institute Fellowship at the Bunting Institute (since renamed the Radcliffe Institute for Advanced Study at Harvard) and a grant as a Radcliffe Scholar for Independent Study; a fellowship to Yale Norfolk School of Art; a grant then under Princeton's aegis at the National Institute of Arts & Letters (NIAL); a Ford Foundation grant in sculpture and drawing; the American Academy of Arts & Letters Arts & Letters Award; and a research grant from Wheaton College.

Exhibitions 

 Boris Mirski Gallery, Boston
 Boston Arts Festival, MA
Circulo de Bellas Artes, Madrid
 Cober Gallery, NYC
Currier Museum of Art, Manchester, NH
 DeCordova Museum and Sculpture Park, Lincoln, MA
Federal Reserve Bank, Boston
 Forum Gallery, NYC
Galerie Internationale, NYC
Museum of Art, Durham, NH
 National Institute of Arts & Letters (NIAL)
New Bedford Art Museum, MA
New York State Council on the Arts, NY
Rew Dex Gallery, Kyoto
Salones Berkowitsch, Madrid 
Tragos Gallery, NYC 
 Victoria & Albert Museum, London

Collections 

 Addison Gallery of American Art, Andover, MA 
 Canton Museum of Art, Canton, OH
Currier Museum of Art, Manchester, NH
 Fogg Art Museum at Harvard University, Cambridge, MA
Weisman Art Museum, Minneapolis, MN
 Museum of Art, Durham, NH
Ohio State University, Columbus
 Pennsylvania Academy of Fine Arts (PAFA)
Rhode Island School of Design (RISD) Museum, Providence
Sloan Art Library, University of North Carolina, Chapel Hill
Worcester Public Library, Worcester Biography Files
University of Massachusetts, Amherst
Vanderbilt University, Fine Arts Gallery Collection, Nashville, TN

Archives 
Reopel (Zabarsky), Joyce:

 Art & Artist files, Smithsonian American Art Museum/National Portrait Gallery Library, Washington, DC
 Folder, Smithsonian American Art Museum/National Portrait Gallery Library, Washington, DC
 Historic Preservation Papers – MS067 Portsmouth Athenaeum, NH
 Toshihiro Katayama posters, Houghton Library, MA
 Radcliffe College Archives sound recordings collection, 1951-2008, Schlesinger Library, Radcliffe Institute, MA
 Records of the Radcliffe College Alumnae Association, Cambridge, MA
 Records of the Mary Ingraham Bunting Institute, 1933-2008, Schlesinger Library, Radcliffe Institute, MA

Publications/Notable Reproductions 

The Hollow Men, WAM Press, Reopel and Sorenson, 1953
Joyce Reopel: Drawings in silverpoint and goldpoint, November 9th through December 4th, 1965
Joyce Reopel: Drawings in silverpoint, goldpoint, and pencil: January 22nd through February 15th, 1969
The Liberal Context, Issues 1–9, 1-17. Edited by Cudhea, David W., with Anne Chiarenza, Gobin Stair, Orloff Miller. Published by College Centers Committee of American Unitarian Association in cooperation with Liberal Religious Youth (LRY) Inc. Art by Joyce Reopel and others, 1961-1966

Personal life 
Born in Worcester, MA in 1933, and raised in nearby Auburn, Reopel was the only child of homemaker Ada (née Anderson) and musician Ernest Reopel. A first cousin to scientist Paul Englund on her mother's side, she was also a distant cousin to French Canadian artist Jean-Paul Riopelle on her father's. In 1955, Reopel married painter and fellow Worcester Art Museum School graduate Mel Zabarsky. Her other professional endeavors included time spent teaching at the Swain School College of Design, the University of New Hampshire and elsewhere. In 1976, her life-long interest in politics helped win her a two-year term in the New Hampshire House of Representatives. A respect for history and passion for architecture led to her interest in preservation, the documented history of her own house, and the founding of the Portsmouth Historic District Commission.

Bibliography 

Butler, Cornelia H., et al.  WACK! Art and the Feminist Revolution. United Kingdom: Museum of Contemporary Art, 2007. ISBN 978-0914357995, 0914357999
Falk, Peter Hastings (ed). Who Was Who in American Art, 1564-1975: 400 years of artists in America. (3 Volumes.) Madison, CT: Sound View Press, 1999. ISBN 978-0932087577Painting in Boston: 1950-2000. Lafo, Rachel R. University of Massachusetts Press, 2002; 
Nemser, Cindy, et al. Feminist Art Journal, vol. 3, no. 1, 1974. JSTOR, jstor.org/stable/10.2307/community.28036286. Accessed 30 Aug. 2021.
Schwartz, Barry. The New Humanism: Art in a Time of Change. Praeger Publishers, 1974; 
Walkey, Frederick P.  New England Women. Decordova Museum, 1975; 
Audience: The Quarterly Review of Literature & the Arts, Vol. 5, Issue 3. Audience Press, 1958; 
Collected Visions: Women Artists at the Bunting Institute, 1961-1986, Cambridge, Mass.: Mary Ingraham Bunting Institute, Radcliffe College, 1986; 
Humanism in New England Art. De Cordova Museum Publisher, Lincoln, MA, 1970;

Notes 

1933 births
American people of French-Canadian descent
American people of Swedish descent
2019 deaths
21st-century American sculptors
21st-century American painters
21st-century American women artists
American women painters
Artists from Worcester, Massachusetts
Painters from Massachusetts
American women sculptors
Sculptors from Massachusetts
American draughtsmen
Boston expressionism
American Expressionist painters
Surrealist artists
Mythological painters
People associated with the Worcester Art Museum
Alumni of the Ruskin School of Art
Women state legislators in New Hampshire